Sophie Rodriguez (born 7 July 1988) is a French snowboarder who won a bronze medal in halfpipe at 2013 FIS Snowboarding World Championships, behind Arielle Gold and Holly Crawford.

References

External links
 
 
 
 
 

1988 births
Living people
French female snowboarders
Olympic snowboarders of France
Snowboarders at the 2006 Winter Olympics
Snowboarders at the 2010 Winter Olympics
Snowboarders at the 2014 Winter Olympics
Snowboarders at the 2018 Winter Olympics
Université Savoie-Mont Blanc alumni
Universiade medalists in snowboarding
Universiade silver medalists for France
Competitors at the 2011 Winter Universiade
People from Échirolles
Sportspeople from Isère
21st-century French women